Wolfie is an American indie rock band.

Wolfie may alsorefer to:

People
 Martin Adams (born 1956), British darts player
 Wolfie Kodesh (1918–2002), South African communist party activist
 Wolfgang Van Halen (born 1991), American guitarist

Fictional characters
 Wolfie (Arrowverse), from Legends of Tomorrow
 Wolfie, the lead character in the British TV sitcom Citizen Smith
 Wolfie, from the children's Disney TV series Special Agent Oso
 Wolfie, a character from the television film and television series Casper's Scare School
 Wolfie, a werewolf character from the 1995 film Monster Mash

School mascots
 Wolfie and Wolfie Jr., former and current mascot of the University of Nevada, Reno
 Wolfie the Seawolf, the mascot of Stony Brook University
 Wolfie, the mascot of the American University of Rome

See also
 Wolf (disambiguation)